Eduard Davidovich Frolov (1 March 1933 – death published on 19 August 2018) was a Russian historian, Doctor of Sciences (Dsc), Honorary Professor at the Saint Petersburg State University since 2010, and Director of the Center for Classics Studies at the same University since 1994, Honored Scientist of the Russian Federation (1998). He was also Honorary Worker of Higher Professional Education the Russian Federation (2004).

Frolov graduated from the Saint Petersburg State University in 1955. In 1958 he defended his Candidate's Dissertation. In 1972, he defended his doctoral dissertation. In 1974 he received the title of Professor.

From 1971 to 2015, Frolov headed the Department of History of Ancient Greece and Rome at the Saint Petersburg State University.

Frolov was a member of the Editorial Board for Journal of Ancient History.

Professor Frolov is the author more than 300 scientific works, including 15 monographs.

References

External links
 Saint Petersburg State University

1933 births
2018 deaths
20th-century Russian historians
Honoured Scientists of the Russian Federation
Russian classical scholars
Academic staff of Saint Petersburg State University
21st-century Russian historians